Cosmoderes elegans is a species of true weevils in the subfamily Scolytinae. It is found in New Guinea.

References

External links 

 
 Cosmoderes elegans at insectoid.info

Beetles described in 1975
Scolytinae
Arthropods of New Guinea